BPM 132 is the debut studio album by J-pop duo Two-Mix, released by King Records on August 23, 1995. It includes the debut single "Just Communication", which was used as the first opening theme of the anime series Mobile Suit Gundam Wing.

The album peaked at No. 16 on Oricon's weekly albums chart.

Track listing 
All lyrics are written by Shiina Nagano; all music is composed by Minami Takayama, except where indicated; all music is arranged by Two-Mix.

Charts

References

External links 
 
 

1995 debut albums
Two-Mix albums
Japanese-language albums
King Records (Japan) albums